Alassan Manjam Gutiérrez (born 12 September 2002), simply known as Alassan, is a Spanish footballer who plays as a left winger for CD Tenerife.

Club career
Alassán joined CD Tenerife in 2021, from CD Sobradillo. Initially assigned to the C-team in the Preferente Interinsular, he also featured for the reserves in Tercera División RFEF during the campaign.

Alassán made his first team debut on 28 October 2022, coming on as a second-half substitute for Teto in a 2–0 Segunda División home loss against Real Zaragoza.

References

External links

2002 births
Living people
People from Tenerife
Spanish footballers
Footballers from the Canary Islands
Association football wingers
Segunda División players
Tercera Federación players
CD Tenerife B players
CD Tenerife players
Spanish people of Bissau-Guinean descent
Spanish sportspeople of African descent